Peter Henderson Bryce (August 17, 1853 – January 15, 1932) was a public health physician for the Ontario provincial and Canadian federal governments. As a public official he submitted reports that highlighted the mistreatment of Indigenous students in the Canadian Indian residential school system and advocated for the improvement of environmental conditions at the schools. He also worked on the health of immigrant populations in Canada.

Biography
Peter Bryce was born  in Mount Pleasant, Ontario, on August 17, 1853. He obtained his medical degree from the University of Toronto, where he studied natural science geology, and went on to study neurology in Paris. He lectured in 1878-79 at the Ontario Agricultural College in Guelph, Ontario, in science and applied chemistry. Bryce served as the first secretary of the Ontario Board of Health from 1882 to 1904, and was also named as Ontario's first Chief Officer of Health in 1887 and Ontario Deputy Registrar General (in charge of Vital Statistics) in 1892.
He was a member of the Canadian Association for the Prevention of Tuberculosis, and in 1900 became the first Canadian president of the American Public Health Association.
Topics of his early papers included hypnotism, malaria, smallpox, diphtheria, sewage disposal, cholera, water supplies, ventilation, milk supply problems, tuberculosis, and the influence of forests on rainfall and health.

In 1904 Bryce was appointed the Chief Medical Officer of the federal Departments of the Interior and Indian Affairs.
His 1905 and 1906 annual reports emphasized the abnormally high death rates for Indigenous peoples in Canada. In 1907 he wrote a "Report on the Indian Schools of Manitoba and the Northwest Territories" describing the health conditions of the Canadian residential school system in western Canada and British Columbia.
This report was never released by the government but was published by Bryce in 1922 under the title The Story of a National Crime: Being a Record of the Health Conditions of the Indians of Canada from 1904 to 1921.

Bryce wrote that Indigenous children enrolled in residential schools were deprived of adequate medical attention and sanitary living conditions. He suggested improvements to national policies regarding the care and education of Indigenous peoples. In a 1907 report Bryce cited an average mortality rate of between 14% and 24% at the schools and a shocking 42% infant mortality rate on the reserves, this due to sick children being sent home to die. Bryce noted that the lack of certainty about the exact number of deaths was, in part, due to the official reports submitted by school principals and "defective way in which the returns had been made."

He appealed his forced retirement from the Civil Service in 1921 and was denied, subsequently publishing his suppressed report condemning the treatment of the Indigenous at the hands of the Department of Indian Affairs that had been given the responsibility under the  British North America Act.

Bryce died on January 15, 1932, while travelling in the West Indies. Dr. Bryce is buried and honoured at Beechwood Cemetery in Ottawa, the same location as  Nicholas Flood Davin, author of the 1879 Davin Report that called for the establishment of a residential school system in Canada and  Duncan Campbell Scott who served as deputy superintendent of the Department of Indian Affairs from 1913-1932.  To assist reconciliation while also addressing historical and societal injustices, Beechwood Cemetery has a Reconciling History program, where  “school children of all backgrounds...place paper hearts of gratitude and remembrance at Dr. Bryce’s grave site, as they do their own part for reconciliation."

Publications

"Report on the Indian schools of Manitoba and the Northwest Territories". Internet Archive. Ottawa : Government Printing Bureau, 1907. Retrieved 5 June 2021.
"Insanity in immigrants: a paper read before the American Public Health Association, at Richmond, Va., October, 1909". Internet Archive. Ottawa: Government Printing Bureau, 1910. Retrieved 5 June 2021.
"The illumination of Joseph Keeler, Esq., or, On, to the land!". Internet Archive. Boston, Mass.: The American Journal of Public Health, 1915. Retrieved 5 June 2021.

See also 
List of Canadian residential schools
United States Indian Boarding School
New Zealand Native schools
Indian Residential Schools Truth and Reconciliation Commission
Canada - Institutional racism

Sources

References

External links

Pushed out and silenced, CBC Unreserved, April 20, 2020| access date= 19 May 2020 .https://www.cbc.ca/radio/unreserved/exploring-the-past-finding-connections-in-little-known-indigenous-history-1.5531914/pushed-out-and-silenced-how-one-doctor-was-punished-for-speaking-out-about-residential-schools-1.5534953

Canadian public health doctors
Canadian whistleblowers
Residential schools in Canada
Cultural assimilation
University of Toronto alumni
1853 births
1932 deaths
People who died at sea
Burials at Beechwood Cemetery (Ottawa)
People from the County of Brant